The dark fruit-eating bat (Artibeus obscurus), is a bat species from South America.

Description 
Their fur is longer and darker than that of their closest relatives, being dark brown to sooty black over most of the body, with a white frosting. The underparts are paler, and there are also faint stripes of pale fur on the face. The nose-leaf is broad, with a distinct horseshoe separated from the upper lip. The snout is relatively narrow for a bat of its small size, and the ears are rounded, with a sharply pointed tragus.

Distribution and habitat
Dark-fruit eating bats are found throughout the Amazon Basin. They are known from all but the southernmost parts of Brazil, from the Guyanas, and from the Amazonian regions of countries from Venezuela to Bolivia. There are no recognised subspecies.

Biology
The bats are generally low-flying, travelling close to the ground through forested terrain. They feed on figs, and the fruit of trees such as shimbillo and uvilla. Mating takes place between September and November, and results in the birth of a single offspring.

Gallery

References 

Artibeus
Bats of South America
Bats of Brazil
Fauna of the Amazon
Mammals of Bolivia
Mammals of Colombia
Mammals of Ecuador
Mammals of French Guiana
Mammals of Guyana
Mammals of Peru
Mammals of Suriname
Mammals of Venezuela
Mammals described in 1826